The London Youlan Qin Society (often abbreviated to LYQS) is a London-based qin society serving guqin players in the UK. Of the three major qin societies of the West (the other two being the North American Guqin Association and the New York Qin Society), this society was the most informal but still the most active in terms of regular events and s.

The Society began to draft a formal constitution in 2011 (ratified at the 2013 AGM) and has become a more formal learned society.

History
The society was founded in July 2003 by Dr Cheng Yu and several guqin enthusiasts. According to the society's website, the society aims to "promote interest in and understanding of Chinese musical culture and philosophy, [...] especially of the qin in the UK." The society had existed before then in an inchoate form with a group of qin players having irregular . Then in 2003, the group of players decided to create a more formal society at the suggestion of Gong Yi (who was visiting the UK at the time), thereby creating Britain's first and only qin society.

The name of the society was arrived at after Gong Yi suggested 'London' sounded more cultured than 'UK' and upon Cheng Yu suggesting , (meaning "solitary orchid", the name of a famous guqin melody), Gong Yi informed her that that was the name of his daughter by coincidence.

The society is an offshoot of the UK Chinese Ensemble, also headed by Cheng, which includes the Silk String Quartet and other projects.

During 2009, it was decided that the Society would become more formal and adopt a new constitution to expand the Society's promotion as well as gain easier access to funding due to wide-ranging cuts in arts funding in recent years placing its summer school programmes in jeopardy. Plans were laid down in October of that year and in 2011 the Society officially became formal with its first AGM held in January of that year.

A new committee was elected to support the Society's increased workload.

Meetings and activities
The main activities the society holds are regular bi-monthly  (informal gatherings of qin enthusiasts) as well as the occasional concert and the yearly guqin music summer school in association with (before 2011) the Asian Music Circuit at the Royal Academy of Music, London.
 
The early  were usually held at a house of a member, the majority of which was held in Twickenham. Since 2011, almost all  are now held at SOAS.

Though it is primarily based in London, the society may hold meetings at other places in the UK for special occasions. One such meeting was held at Oxford University in 2004. On average, around 10 – 20 members attend for each meeting though for special events, such as when a famous qin master comes over from China, the number of attendees increase significantly. 

A concert is held at least once a year, usually coinciding with the summer schools. Other than this, concerts are usually held to coincide with special events, sometimes at museum exhibitions or a festival etc. 

The Society has an AGM in January every year and its meeting are mostly held at SOAS since 2011.

Summer schools

The summer school in London is the Society's main event of the year, started in 2003. Each year, a qin master/player is invited to London to teach students for a week. So far, Prof. Li Xianting, Gong Yi, Prof. Zeng Chengwei and Dai Xiaolian have taught at the summer school, with Prof. Zeng becoming the most often. During these summer schools, there is the main Society yaji/anniversary/Congregation event of the year, attended by the professor, members of the Society and guests. The summer school is the only of its kind outside China to offer yearly tuition from qin masters from China.

Since 2011, the Society has a more direct involvement with organising summer schools and workshops independent of the AMC. Since 2013, due to timing constraints and/or funding issues, the Society began holding its summer schools at the Royal College of Music and, since 2015, the China Exchange without inviting over a qin player from China. The classes are now taught by Cheng Yu for the intermediate/advance class and Charles Tsua for the beginners. On top of this, since 2016, there are seasonal weekly classes held at the London Fo Guang Shan Temple which is taught by Cheng Yu.

The First International Guqin Festival 2018
In 2017, the Society decided to organise and host an international guqin festival in London in the summer of 2018. They received an Arts Council grant and the Festival was held between 20-26 August to great success. Special invited guests included the masters Zeng Chengwei and his son Zeng He as their families and students, Li Xiangting, and Marie-Anne Souloumiac van Gulik (granddaughter of Robert Hans van Gulik). 

The Festival consisted of a 4-day summer school, taught by Zeng Chengwei (advance class), Zeng He (intermediate), Charles Rupert Tsua (beginners), and Cheng Yu (post-beginners), a 2-day conference, 2 masterclasses (taught by Zeng Chengwei and Li Xianting), a film screening, and a tour of 4 concerts (Oxford, Cambridge and two in London). 

The Festival drew in participants from around the globe, including Germany, Canada, Taiwan, China, Norway, America, as well as local UK people.

Membership
Before 2011, the society comprises three permanently elected officers (President, Secretary and Treasurer though the office of last was never officially exercised due to the fact that the Society never charged a subscription fee or formally had any expenditure during this period), several artistic consultants and numerous ordinary members who were basically mailing list subscribers. Since 2011, a committee was set up consisting of three officers as previous and three ordinary committee members, several non-executive officers and patrons in addition to the ordinary subscribing membership.

Membership is open to all who have an interest in music, particularly the music of the guqin, or are qin players/musicians. Members receive regular mailings via e-mail about the society's activities and important upcoming events. There is no formal requirement for members to attend any of the meetings or  but they must, beginning January 2011, pay a subscription fee.

There are two levels of membership: Full and Associate. Associate membership is aimed at those who maybe living outside the UK who may not be able to attend meetings or participate in events and activities as easily and/or regularly as those who reside within the UK (they are primarily barred from voting or standing for elections and have no access to the Society's library and resources).

Executive committee
Committee members are elected every three years and consist of the President, Secretary, Treasurer, three Ordinary Members and several Non-executive Officers.

The current President is:

 Dr Cheng Yu, MMus, PhD (2003–2010, then re-elected in 2011 and for subsequent terms)

Patrons
Formerly called Consultants and then Advisers to the Society before formalisation.

 Prof. Li Xianting
 Gong Yi
 Hu Feifei (former Secretary of the Prince's Charities Foundation, China)

Notes

References

External links
 LYQS official site
 LYQS Facebook page

Guqin organizations
Arts organisations based in the United Kingdom
2003 establishments in the United Kingdom
Organizations established in 2003
Cultural organisations based in London